ASC Healthcare is a mental health service provider based in Bolton. It runs the Breightmet Centre an autism treatment centre in Bolton which opened in 2013, and, for a short period, a small hospital, Mayfield Court in Whalley Range which is used for short term placements of mental health patients.  It also proposed in 2019 to open a similar acute crisis unit for mental health patients in Blackburn.

The Breightmet Centre, which took patients from all over England, was forced to shut suddenly after "serious concerns" were raised by the Care Quality Commission in July 2019 and its registration was revoked. The inspectors  identified serious concerns both with the centre’s physical environment and with the company’s understanding of patients' healthcare needs. The site was dirty, with food and human waste in some of the bedrooms and social areas. Services were taken over by Mersey Care NHS Foundation Trust. It was rated “Good” in 2018.  The second inspection appears to have been undertaken as result of complaints by a parent of a 20-year old resident from Gloucestershire who said that both she and her son were absolutely traumatised.

Subsequently Mayfield Court, which was used by NHS trusts when there were no available NHS beds, was also inspected by the Care Quality Commission. It was rated ‘inadequate’ overall and placed into special measures. There were complaints about the state of the premises.  The service’s quality audits had failed to fully identify risks, including a ligature point and the external perimeter fence being easily climbable. There had been 10 incidents of people leaving the service without authorisation since May 2019.

In 2022 the Breightmet Centre, which had then 17 people with autism, was put in special measure by the Care Quality Commission because  "people were not protected from abuse and poor care" and there was a lack of appropriately skilled staff.  Earlier there had been complaints about patients being assaulted.

See also
Private medicine in the United Kingdom

References

Private providers of NHS services
Health in Greater Manchester
Health care companies of the United Kingdom
Mental health in England